Bevan Ernest Congdon  (11 February 1938 – 10 February 2018) was a New Zealand cricket all-rounder who played 61 Test matches and 11 One Day Internationals from 1965 to 1978, which included a spell as captain.

Captaincy
He was captain of the New Zealand Test and ODI team from 1972 to 1974, and was the first New Zealand captain to record a victory over Australia. Congdon was principally a batsman but also became a useful medium-pace bowler midway through his career.

Record breaking
His finest moments in Tests were in England in 1973 when he scored 176 at Trent Bridge and 175 at Lord's in successive Tests, and during the determined foray by the Kiwis to the West Indies in 1972, when he took over the captaincy from Graham Dowling. In the Trent Bridge match, New Zealand chased 479 in the final innings, falling short by only 38 runs. At the time, this was a Test record for a highest score in the fourth innings to lose a match.

In 1975, Congdon became the first New Zealand batsman to score an ODI century at Basin Reserve. The second one was scored by Kane Williamson, 43 years later, on 6 January 2018 vs. Pakistan.

The innings at Lord's contributed to New Zealand making 551, their highest score in Tests at the time. Asked afterwards how he prepared for Test cricket in his remote, intemperate South Island hometown, he replied that net pitches in Motueka prepared one for anything.

Honours
In the 1975 New Year Honours, Congdon was appointed an Officer of the Order of the British Empire, for services to cricket.

References

External links 
 
 "Vale Bevan Congdon" from the New Zealand Cricket Museum

1938 births
2018 deaths
Canterbury cricketers
Central Districts cricketers
Cricketers from Motueka
International Cavaliers cricketers
New Zealand cricketers
New Zealand Officers of the Order of the British Empire
New Zealand One Day International captains
New Zealand One Day International cricketers
New Zealand Test cricket captains
New Zealand Test cricketers
Otago cricketers
South Island cricketers
Wellington cricketers
Wisden Cricketers of the Year